Leo Rising is an album by saxophonist Frank Foster which was recorded in 1996 and released on the Arabesque label the following year.

Reception

The AllMusic review by Scott Yanow said "This is one of Frank Foster's finest small-group dates and is highly recommended". In JazzTimes, Bill Shoemaker called it "a balm-like program that will quell the most righteous outrage", observing that "Foster’s art lies in his projection of a relaxed energy, a combination of a quick wit, acute insights, and graceful execution ... Foster’s solos are lean and muscular".

Track listing
All compositions by Frank Foster except where noted
 "You're Only as Old as You Look" – 8:07
 "Simone" – 12:14
 "Gray Thursday" – 7:18
 "Cidade Alto" – 3:30
 "Leo Rising" – 8:06
 "When April Comes Again" (Paul Weston, Doris Schaefer) – 5:29
 "Last Night When We Were Young" (Harold Arlen, Yip Harburg) – 11:19
 "Derricksteriy" – 6:32

Personnel
Frank Foster – tenor saxophone, soprano saxophone
Derrick Gardner – trumpet (tracks 5 & 8)
Stephen Scott – piano
Christian McBride – double bass
Lewis Nash – drums

References

Arabesque Records albums
Frank Foster (musician) albums
1997 albums